is a Japanese football player. He plays for Montedio Yamagata.

Career
Hayata Komatsu joined J3 League club YSCC Yokohama in 2017.

Club statistics
Updated to 2 January 2020.

References

External links
Profile at FC Ryukyu

1997 births
Living people
Juntendo University alumni
Association football people from Tokyo
Japanese footballers
J2 League players
J3 League players
YSCC Yokohama players
FC Ryukyu players
Montedio Yamagata players
Association football midfielders